Omar Al Midani (born 26 January 1994 in Syria) is a Syrian footballer. He currently plays as a centre back for Al-Nasr, which competes in the Kuwait Premier League, the top division in Kuwait.

International goals

References

External links
 

1994 births
Living people
Syrian footballers
Syria international footballers
Association football defenders
Al-Mina'a SC players
Syrian expatriates in Iraq
Expatriate footballers in Iraq
Sportspeople from Damascus
Hatta Club players
Expatriate footballers in the United Arab Emirates
Syrian expatriate sportspeople in the United Arab Emirates
UAE Pro League players
Pyramids FC players
Expatriate footballers in Egypt
Syrian expatriate sportspeople in Egypt
2019 AFC Asian Cup players
Syrian Premier League players
Syrian expatriate sportspeople in Kuwait
Expatriate footballers in Kuwait
Kuwait Premier League players
Kuwait SC players
Al-Nasr SC (Kuwait) players
Egyptian Premier League players